Caladenia evanescens,  commonly known as the semaphore spider orchid, is a species of orchid endemic to a small area near Albany in the south-west of Western Australia. It is a rare species with a single, hairy leaf and one or two cream-coloured to greenish-cream flowers.

Description 
Caladenia evanescens is a terrestrial, perennial, deciduous, herb with an underground tuber. The lateral sepals are about the same size as the dorsal sepal and are stiffly held at an angle below the horizontal and curve downwards. The labellum is creamy yellow with red lines and spots, with short teeth along part of the sides and about ten pairs of white to cream-coloured, anvil-shaped calli in two rows along its centre. Flowering occurs in November.

Taxonomy and naming 
Caladenia evanescens was first described by Stephen Hopper and Andrew Brown in 2001 from a specimen near Peaceful Bay, Denmark. The description was published in Nuytsia. The specific epithet (evanescens) is a Latin word meaning "disappearing" referring to the rarity of the species.

Distribution and habitat 
Semaphore spider orchid is only known from two locations between Albany and Peaceful Bay in the Jarrah Forest and Warren biogeographic regions where it grows on the base of coastal sand dunes.

Conservation
Caladenia evanescens is classified as "Priority One" by the Western Australian Government Department of Parks and Wildlife, meaning that it is known from only one or a few locations which are potentially at risk.

References 

evanescens
Orchids of Western Australia
Endemic orchids of Australia
Plants described in 2001
Endemic flora of Western Australia
Taxa named by Stephen Hopper
Taxa named by Andrew Phillip Brown